Catocala lupina is a moth in the family Erebidae first described by Gottlieb August Wilhelm Herrich-Schäffer in 1851. It is found from south-eastern Europe to south-western Siberia, Asia Minor and Transcaucasia.

Adults are on wing from July to early September.

The larvae feed on Salix and Populus species.

Subspecies
Catocala lupina lupina
Catocala lupina kastshenkoi Sheljuzhko, 1943 (Transcaucasia)

References

lupina
Moths described in 1851
Moths of Europe
Moths of Asia
Taxa named by Gottlieb August Wilhelm Herrich-Schäffer